Eleonora Forenza (born 10 November 1976) is an Italian politician, spokesperson for culture and communications in the Communist Refoundation Party. She is also a member of the collective Femministe Nove and a member of the board of the International Gramsci Society of Italy. Forenza graduated in Classics and Italian Literature at the University of Bari, where she obtained also a PhD in Italian studies.

At the 2014 European Parliament election she was elected as a Member of the European Parliament as a candidate of The Other Europe. On 7 December 2016, she was chosen as the European presidential candidate for European United Left–Nordic Green Left.

References

External links
 

1976 births
Living people
MEPs for Italy 2014–2019
21st-century women MEPs for Italy
People from Bari
University of Bari alumni
The Other Europe MEPs
Communist Refoundation Party MEPs